Pieve di Bono-Prezzo is a comune (municipality) in Trentino in the northern Italian region Trentino-Alto Adige/Südtirol, located about  south of Trento. It was formed on 1 January 2016 as the merger of the previous communes of Pieve di Bono and Prezzo.

References

External links
 Official website

Cities and towns in Trentino-Alto Adige/Südtirol